Bitter Tongues is an album by Ann Beretta, released in 1997 via Fueled by Ramen.

Critical reception
AllMusic wrote that "with some judicious pruning ... Bitter Tongues would be a pop-punk treasure." Reviewing a reissue, Ox-Fanzine noted: "Not that they sound particularly polished today, but back then they were a bit rougher and gruff, but they also had the melancholy, hymn-like melodies on board for which they are valued."

Track listing
Forever Family
Fuel
FM
Dirty Faces
Mr. Bowling
Wasteland
Broadway
Bottlecaps
St. Marks
MCA
Shovel
Costello
Hate Mail
Tommy Gunn
Spite
Mary
Baker Street
Efforts Wasted
Crash (Primitives cover)

References

1997 albums
Ann Beretta albums
Fueled by Ramen albums